"Stargazer" is a song by the British-American rock supergroup Rainbow, released as fifth track from the band's second studio album Rising (1976). It is an epic song narrating the story of a powerful wizard whose attempt to fly by constructing a mystical tower to the stars leads to the enslavement of vast numbers of people. "Stargazer" is notable for its musical complexity, with the guitar, lyrics, and drum solo cited as significant examples of the talents of guitarist Ritchie Blackmore, singer Ronnie James Dio, and drummer Cozy Powell.

Description
The epic-length rock track with symphonic influences starts with a short drum solo by Cozy Powell, a "great drumming moment" frequently cited as an example of his skills. It features the Munich Philharmonic Orchestra, a Vako Orchestron, and what Ritchie Blackmore called "a string thing all playing this half-Turkish Scale". Blackmore's solo, after the second verse, is in B Phrygian dominant scale, and is cited as "one of his best".

The song has been called a "morality tale", and its lyrics are written from the standpoint of a "slave in Egyptian times", according to lyricist Ronnie James Dio. They relate the story of the Wizard, an astronomer who becomes "obsessed with the idea of flying" and enslaves a vast army of people to build him a tower from which he can take off and fly. The people hope for the day when their misery comes to an end, building the tower in harsh conditions ("In the heat and rain, with whips and chains; /just to see him fly, too many died"). In the end, the wizard climbs to the top of the tower but, instead of flying, falls down and dies: "no sound as he falls instead of rising. / Time standing still, then there's blood on the sand". The next song, "A Light in the Black", continues the story of the people who have lost all purpose after the Wizard's death "until they see the Light in the Dark", according to Dio.

Critical legacy
AllMusic and MusicHound describe the song as one of Rainbow's classics, AllMusic calling it a "bombastic, strings-enriched epic". Vincent DeMasi, transcribing part of Blackmore's solo as an example of his taste for "classical drama" with a "Middle Eastern flavor", calls the song an "operatic blockbuster". Jeff Perkins argues that the "incredible epic", one of the band's highlights, derives its strength from Blackmore's guitar playing, Dio's lyrics and vocals, and Powell's drumming. Andy DiGelsomina, composer for the neo-operatic metal project Lyraka, argued for both Wagnerian and existentialist interpretations of the lyrics. A poll held by Gibson ranked the song the 17th greatest heavy metal song of all time.

Alternate versions
"Stargazer (Rough Mix)", an early mix from the 2011 Deluxe Edition of Rising, starts with a keyboard intro played by Tony Carey and has a length of 9:08.

Personnel

Rainbow 
Ritchie Blackmore – lead guitar
Ronnie James Dio – lead vocals
Cozy Powell – drums, percussion
Jimmy Bain – bass
Tony Carey – keyboards

Additional personnel 
Munich Philharmonic Orchestra – strings section, french horn
Fritz Sonnleitner – concert master
Rainer Pietsch – conductor

References

External links
Lyrics for the entire album

1976 songs
Fantasy music
Rainbow (rock band) songs
Songs about wizards
Songs written by Ritchie Blackmore
Songs written by Ronnie James Dio